Špital is a settlement in the hills west of Zagorje ob Savi in central Slovenia. The area is part of the traditional region of Styria. It is now included with the rest of the Municipality of Zagorje ob Savi in the Central Sava Statistical Region.

History
Špital became an independent settlement in 2000, when its territory was separated from Požarje and Mošenik.

References

External links
Špital on Geopedia

Populated places in the Municipality of Zagorje ob Savi